Winds of Change: The Future of Democracy in Iran is a book written by  Reza Pahlavi, former Crown Prince of Iran. The book is dedicated to the future of Iran. In his book, he advocates the principles of freedom, democracy and human rights for his countrymen. The book was published in 2002 in English by Regnery Publishing, and later into Persian.

References

2002 non-fiction books
Political books
Books about politics of Iran